Buttershaw Business and Enterprise College is a co-educational secondary school and sixth form located in the Buttershaw area of Bradford, West Yorkshire, England.

History
It opened on 3 September 1956 as Buttershaw Secondary School, with only one three storey teaching block as it was only half built. The initial intake was 300 children and 12 staff. Mr H E Cooke was the first headmaster. Over the next seven years a house block, theatre and swimming pool were added with an official opening in 1964. The school was built to accommodate the baby boom caused by the large number of children born after the end of the Second World War.

It was renamed Buttershaw Comprehensive School, and over the years it evolved into an Upper, then High School, removing its pool for an AstroTurf field. On 23 September 2006 over 100 pupils from the first intake of 1956 met at the Cedar Court Hotel, Bradford to celebrate the school's Golden Anniversary. In the 2007 Queens Birthday Honours list David Kershaw, the school's first head boy (1956), was made a CBE for his services to education. 2008 saw the opening of the new building. As the new building was opened the school was renamed Buttershaw Business and Enterprise College because of its new specialist status.

Buttershaw Business and Enterprise College became a foundation school administered by the Buttershaw Learning and Achievement Trust and Bradford City Council. However, in September 2016 the school converted to academy status and is now sponsored by the Bradford Diocesan Academies Trust.

Academics
Buttershaw Business and Enterprise College offers GCSEs and BTECs as programmes of study for pupils, while students in the sixth form have the option to study from a range of A-levels and further BTECs.

Notable former pupils
Alex Corina, Artist
Andrea Dunbar, Playwright
John Duttine, Actor
Terry Rooney, Labour Party politician
Cameron Scott, Rugby League Player

References

External links
Buttershaw Business and Enterprise College official website

Secondary schools in the City of Bradford
Educational institutions established in 1956
1956 establishments in England
Academies in the City of Bradford
Specialist business and enterprise colleges